Jhenaidah District is a district in southwestern Bangladesh. It is a part of the Khulna Division. It is bordered by Kushtia District to the north, Jessore District and West Bengal, India to the south, Rajbari District and Magura District to the east, and Chuadanga District and West Bengal, India to the west. The largest city and headquarter of this district is Jhenaidah. At the beginning of the British rule Jhenaidah was a police outpost and was turned into a thana in 1793. The Jhenaidah Sub division was established in 1862 and was turned into a district in 1984.

Geography
Annual average temperature: maximum , minimum 
Annual rainfall:

Demographics

According to the 2011 Bangladesh census, Jhenaidah District had a population of 1,771,304, of which 886,402 were males and 884,902 females. Rural population was 1,491,112 (84.18%) and urban population was 280,192 (15.82%). Jhenaidah had a literacy rate of 48.40% for the population 7 years and above: 50.45% for males and 46.35% for females.

Archeological heritage
Biswabat, Bethuli
Harihar Garh, Shailkupa
Shailkupa Jami Mosque, Shailkupa
Ram Gopal Mandir, Shailkupa
Kharer Dighi Mosque, Kaliganj
Jahajghata, Kaliganj
Sawdaghar Dighi and Mosque
Gorai Mosque, Kaliganj
Jor Bangla Mosque, Kaliganj
Galakata Dighi and Mosque, Kaliganj
Cheragdani Dighi and Mosque
Dighi of Sree Ram Raja
Tombs of Ghazi, Kalu & Champabati, Kaliganj
Dhol Samudra Dighi, Jhenaidah Sadar
Naldangha Rajbari and Mandir, Kaliganj
Manasa Mandir, Maheshpur
Krishna Balaram Dev Bigraha Mandir, Kaliganj
Neel Kuthi, Madhupur, Jhenaidah Sadar
Miyar Dalan, Jhenaidah Sadar
Noongola Mosque, Kaliganj
Monahar Mosque, Kaliganj
Pirpukur Mosque, Kaliganj
Sukur Mallik Mosque, Kaliganj
Satgachiya Mosque, Kaliganj
Tombs of Pagla Kanai, Jhenaidah Sadar
Dhannoharia Purbopara Jame Mosque (Dhannoharia, Jadabpur, Moheshpur, Jhenaidah)

Administration

Deputy Commissioner: Soroj Kumar Nath

Chairman of Zila Porishod: Kanak Kanti Das

Subdivisions
There are six upazilas under this district:

 Jhenaidah Sadar Upazila
 Maheshpur Upazila
 Kaliganj Upazila
 Kotchandpur Upazila
 Shailkupa Upazila
 Harinakunda Upazila

City and towns
Jhenaidah district includes 1 municipal city Jhenaidah & 5 towns. All are governed by municipalities.

Education

Colleges
 Government Birshestha Shahid Hamidur Rahman Degree College
 Government K.C. College Jhenaidah
 Government K. M. H. College, Kotchandpur
 Kotchandpur Paura Mohila Degree College
 Maheshpur Government Degree College
 Mahtab Uddin College, Kaliganj
 Moheshpur Poura Mohila Degree College
 Shahid Nur Ali College, Kaliganj
 Shailkupa Government Degree College

Other tertiary institutions
 Institute of Health Technology, Jhenaidah
 Jhenaidah Government Veterinary College
 Jhenaidah Polytechnic Institute
 Sheikh Kamal Textile Engineering College, Jhenaidah

School and colleges
 Jhenaidah Cadet College
 Kanchannagar Model School and College, Jhenaidah
 Shishu Kunja School & College, Jhenaidah

Secondary schools
 Harinakunda Priyanath High School
 Jehnaidah Government High School
 Jhenaida Government Girls High School
 Joradah High School, Harinakundu
 Kola Bazar United High School, Kaliganj
 Kotchandpur Girls' High School
 Kotchandpur Govt. Model Pilot Secondary School
 Kotchandpur Secondary School (1899)
 Maheshpur High School
 Maheshpur Pilot Girls' High School
 Naldanga Bhushan Pilot Secondary School, Kaliganj
 Raigram Banikanta Secondary School
 Solimunnessa  Pilot  Girls  High  School, Kaliganj

Notable residents

 Abul Hasan Jashori – Islamic scholar and freedom fighter
 Qazi Mu'tasim Billah – Islamic scholar and former professor at the University of Dhaka
 Abdul Hyee – a member of parliament, freedom fighter and commander during the Bangladesh Liberation War
 Bagha Jatin – an Indian Bengali revolutionary against British rule
 Birshrestha Hamidur Rahman – national hero, a sepoy in Bangladesh Army during the Bangladesh Liberation War
 Ila Mitra – activist, Peasants movement organizer of the Indian subcontinent, elected member of Vidhan Sabha (Provincial Assembly) four times between 1962 and 1978.
 Fakir Lalon Shah – a prominent Bengali philosopher, baul saint and social reformer
 Golam Mostofa (poet) – Bengali writer and poet
 Pagla Kanai – a Bengali mystic folk singer, baul and philosopher
 Jamal Nazrul Islam – mathematical physicist and cosmologist
 Zillur Rahman- educationist, former vice-chancellor of Jahangirnagar University

References

External links

 Map of Jhenaidah District 

 
Districts of Bangladesh